KATQ (1070 AM) is a radio station licensed to serve Plentywood, Montana.  The station is owned by Radio International KATQ Broadcast Association, with a country music format. Studios at 112 Third Avenue East.

The 5000 watt AM daytimer signed-on September 14, 1979 with call letters of KATQ honoring the Plentywood Wildcats, mascot of the local high school.  A subsequent owner briefly changed the call letters in the 1980s, but they were returned to KATQ by the Federal Communications Commission on August 1, 1987.

References

External links
KATQ transmitter and studio photos

ATQ (AM)
Country radio stations in the United States
Sheridan County, Montana
Radio stations established in 1979
1979 establishments in North Dakota